Mariola Pavlivna Bodnarchuk (born on March 23, 2002 in Lviv) is a Ukrainian female rhythmic gymnast. She won two gold, one silver and one bronze medal at the 2020 European Championship.

References

External links 
 

2002 births
Living people
Sportspeople from Lviv
Ukrainian rhythmic gymnasts
Medalists at the Rhythmic Gymnastics European Championships
Gymnasts at the 2020 Summer Olympics
Olympic gymnasts of Ukraine
21st-century Ukrainian women